is a Japanese footballer currently playing as a forward for Hokkaido Consadole Sapporo.

Club career
Sato made his professional debut in a 1–2 Emperor's Cup loss against V-Varen Nagasaki.

Career statistics

Club
.

Notes

References

External links

2003 births
Living people
Association football people from Hokkaido
Japanese footballers
Association football forwards
Hokkaido Consadole Sapporo players